Mümtaz Demirhan (born 22 June 1952) is a Turkish alpine skier. He competed in two events at the 1976 Winter Olympics.

References

1952 births
Living people
Turkish male alpine skiers
Olympic alpine skiers of Turkey
Alpine skiers at the 1976 Winter Olympics
Place of birth missing (living people)
20th-century Turkish people